Nick O'Donnell may refer to:
 Nick O'Donnell (hurler)
 Nick O'Donnell (footballer)